The Plantation Covenant of Guilford, Connecticut, sometimes called the Guilford Covenant, was a covenant signed by the English colonists as the founding document of Quinnipiac (modern New Haven) on 1 June 1639. 

The Plantation Covenant was signed on board ship and the names were ordered according to the social and other rankings within the first Guilford company led by Rev. Henry Whitfield. There were twenty-five immigrants, which included the two children of William and Esther Hall. Most of these were young men and women adventurers from Surrey and Kent, who eventually settled at Guilford as farmers.

The covenant stated:

We whose names are herein written, intending by God's gracious permission, to plant ourselves in New England, and if it may be in the southerly part, about Quinpisac [Quinnipiac], we do faithfully promise each for ourselves and families and those that belong to us, that we will, the Lord assisting us, sit down and join ourselves together in one entire plantation and to be helpful to the other in any common work, according to every man's ability and as need shall require, and we promise not to desert or leave each other on the plantation but with the consent of the rest, or the greater part of the company, who have entered into this engagement. As for our gathering together into a church way and the choice officers and members to be joined together in that way, we do refer ourselves until such time as it shall please God to settle us in our plantation.In witness whereof we subscribe our hands, this first day of June 1639

Notes

History of Connecticut
New Haven, Connecticut